This is a list of nature centers and environmental education centers in the state of New York.

To use the sortable tables: click on the icons at the top of each column to sort that column in alphabetical order; click again for reverse alphabetical order.

List

Defunct nature centers
 Marty McGuire Environmental Museum at Dyson College Nature Center, Pleasantville, converted into the Marty McGuire Environmental Lab

See also 
 List of museums in New York
 List of nature centers in the United States
 List of New York state parks

References

External links 
 NY State Department of Environmental Conservation: Nature Centers
 Google map of nature centers and environmental education centers in New York

 
Nature centers
New York